Bhubaneswar North (Uttar) is a Vidhan Sabha constituency of Khordha district, Odisha, India.

This constituency includes 5 Gram panchayats (Raghunathpur, Dadha, Kalyanpur, Barimunda and Kalarahanga) of Bhubaneswar block and Ward No. 1 to 11 & 13 of Bhubaneswar.

Elected Members

Two elections were held between 2009 and 2014. Elected members from the Bhubaneswar North (Uttar) constituency are:

2009: (113): Bhagirathi Badajena (BJD)
2014: (113): Priyadarshi Mishra  (BJD)
2019: (113): Susanta Kumar Rout  (BJD)

2019 Election Result

2014 Election Candidates and Results

2009 Election Results
In 2009 election, Biju Janata Dal candidate Bhagirathi Badajena defeated Bharatiya Janata Party candidate Golak Prasad Mahapatra by a margin of 51,462 votes.

Notes

References

Assembly constituencies of Odisha
Khordha district